Tresham is a village in Gloucestershire, England.

Tresham may also refer to:
HMS Tresham (M2736), a Royal Navy minesweeper
Tresham College of Further and Higher Education, a college in Northamptonshire, England
Tresham Games, a board games publisher

People with the surname
Tresham (surname)